Rocky Mount Electric Power Plant, also known as Pearsall Machine Works, Inc., is a historic power station located at Rocky Mount, Nash County, North Carolina.  It was built in 1901 as a one-story brick facility and raised to its present height of two stories, and a rear addition was made as well, in 1920.  It has a corrugated metal gable roof with parapet gable ends.  The building housed a power plant until 1910.

It was listed on the National Register of Historic Places in 1982.

References

Industrial buildings and structures on the National Register of Historic Places in North Carolina
Industrial buildings completed in 1901
Buildings and structures in Nash County, North Carolina
National Register of Historic Places in Nash County, North Carolina